Thomas A. Kingsbury, also known as Tom, is the Chief Executive Officer of Kohl's Department Stores as of 2023, after the departure of embattled CEO Michelle Gass. He served on the Board of Directors of Kohl's since 2021.  Tom was Chief Executive Officer and President of Burlington Stores, Inc. from 2008 to 2018. Kingsbury was appointed Chairman of the Board of Burlington Stores, Inc. in May 2014. Prior to joining Burlington Stores, Inc., Kingsbury served as Senior Executive Vice President- Information Services, E- Commerce, Marketing and Business Development of Kohl's Corporation from August 2006 to December 2008. Prior to joining Kohl's, Kingsbury served in various management positions with The May Department Stores Company, an operator of department store chains, commencing in 1976 and as President and Chief Executive Officer of the Filene's division since February 2000.

References

American retail chief executives
Living people
Year of birth missing (living people)